Ciaran Patrick Gilligan (born 19 January 2002) is an Irish footballer who plays as a midfielder for Burton Albion.

Career statistics

References

2002 births
Living people
Republic of Ireland association footballers
Association football midfielders
Burton Albion F.C. players
English Football League players